Tiberiu Mihai Coman (born 4 January 2002), is a Romanian professional footballer who plays as forward for Liga I side CS Mioveni, on loan from Star Sport Argeș. In his career, Coman also played for Rapid II București, Unirea Bascov or FC Argeș II Pitești.

References

External links
 

2002 births
Living people
Sportspeople from Bucharest
Romanian footballers
Association football forwards
Liga I players
Liga III players
FC Rapid București players
CS Mioveni players
FC Argeș Pitești players